Fishermans Paradise is a fishing area in Centre County, Pennsylvania, United States.

Fishermans Paradise is located on the east bank of Spring Creek.  The Bellefonte Fish Culture Station is located on the west bank.

The area is noted for its fishing, and Spring Creek contains high concentrations of wild brown trout at this location.  Fishermans Paradise once had a "ladies only" fishing area.

References

Fishing areas
Centre County, Pennsylvania